Emma Anderson (born 10 June 1967) is an English musician. She is best known for being a songwriter, guitarist and singer in the shoegazing/Britpop band Lush.

Musical career
Born in Wimbledon, London, the adopted daughter of a former army officer who ran a gentleman's club in Piccadilly, Anderson attended several schools before taking her O-Levels at Queen's College, where she met Miki Berenyi. As keen music fans, they wrote a fanzine called Alphabet Soup. Her first band, which she joined in 1986, was the Rover Girls (which featured Chris P Mowforth and Stuart Watson, who were both later in Silverfish) as a bass player.

In 1987, while Anderson was at Ealing College of Higher Education studying Humanities and Berenyi was at North London Polytechnic, they formed Lush. Lush played their very first performance at the Camden Falcon in London on 6 March 1988. They went on to reasonable success, having a number of Top 40 hits over an eight-year career. Anderson told Everett True in Melody Maker, "I remember when I couldn't play, I wasn't in a band, didn't know anyone else who could play, and now we've got a record out on 4AD. I sometimes find it impossible to come to terms with what's happening." Anderson and Berenyi were the only women to take part in the 1992 Lollapalooza tour of the United States.

Both Anderson and Berenyi became major music press celebrities as part of The Scene That Celebrates Itself. Music magazines the NME and Melody Maker gleefully reported their social activities on a regular basis, which could be said to overshadow their increasingly strong songwriting. As drummer Chris Acland stated, "people seem to want to talk about Lush's relationship to the press more than they want to talk about Lush."

Of the sound of Lush, Emma said, ""We were kind of punk rock in one way. We did think 'Well, if they can do it, why the fuck can't we?' Basically, our idea was to have extremely loud guitars with much weaker vocals. And, really the vocals were weaker due to nervousness – we'd always be going 'Turn them down! Turn them down!'.""

After their biggest hits, the Top 30 "Single Girl", "Ladykillers" and "500 (Shake Baby Shake)" and Top 10 album, Lovelife, the band's drummer Chris Acland took his own life in 1996. The members were devastated and they split in 1996. Lush officially announced their breakup on 23 February 1998.

While a member of Lush, Anderson also worked with Drum Club contributing vocals and guitar on "Spaced Out Locked In" on their 1993 album Everything Is Now, also playing guitar on "Sound System".

In 1997 Anderson formed a new band with vocalist Lisa O'Neill, Sing-Sing. Emma explained how it started, "I just started writing songs not really knowing what was going to happen though I kind of knew I didn't want to form another 4-piece indie band. I demoed those songs for 4AD with myself singing but was dropped but I wasn't fazed. I then met Lisa O'Neill via a guy I was going out with at the time. She had worked with Mark Van Hoen whom funnily enough, someone I knew said, was looking for collaborators so it kind of all fell into place and Sing-Sing was born."
They released two albums – The Joy of Sing-Sing in 2001 and Sing-Sing and I in 2005, before officially disbanding on New Year's Day 2008.

Anderson joined in reforming Lush in 2015, releasing a four-track EP Blind Spot in early 2016.

Anderson currently resides in Hastings.

Discography

Lush
Scar (mini-LP) – October 1989
Gala – December 1990
Spooky – January 1992
Split – June 1994
Lovelife – March 1996
Ciao! Best of Lush – 2001
Blind Spot EP – April 2016

Sing-Sing
The Joy of Sing-Sing – 2001
Sing-Sing and I – 2005

References

External links
Sing-Sing's MySpace
4AD Lush Page

1967 births
Living people
English adoptees
People educated at Queen's College, London
English women guitarists
English rock guitarists
English women singers
English rock singers
English songwriters
People from Wimbledon, London
Shoegaze musicians
Lush (band) members